Shawn Green may refer to:

Shawn Green (born 1972), American Major League Baseball all star outfielder
Shawn Green (game designer), American video game designer

See also
Sean Green (disambiguation)
 Shonn Greene, American football player